Tokha is a municipality in Kathmandu District in Bagmati Province of Nepal that was established on 2 December 2014 by merging the former Village development committees Dhapasi, Jhor Mahankal, Gongabu, Tokha Chandeshwari and Tokha Saraswati on 2 December 2014. The municipality derives its name from the historical town of Tokha (current ward 2 and 3).

Etymology 
Tokha comes from two Newari words Tu, meaning 'sugarcane' and Khya meaning 'field'. Tokha is known for its production of chaku, a delicacy made from raw sugarcane juice.

Population 
Tokha has a total population of 99,032 according to 2011 Nepal census. There are 25,561 families in the municipality. The total male population is 48,323 and the female population is 50,909.

Governance 
Tokha was created as a municipality on 2 December 2014 after merging Dhapasi, Jhor Mahankal, Gongabu, Tokha Chandeshwari and Tokha Saraswati. Since 2017, Tokha has been divided into 11 wards. Each ward has four ward members, two male members, one female member and one minority member, and one ward chairperson who are elected for a five-year term. The municipality is headed by a directly elected mayor. Prakash Adhikari was the first directly elected mayor of the municipality, elected in May 2017. The current municipal council has 36 members from Nepal Communist Party and 21 members from Nepali Congress.

Sports 
Shree Bhagwati Club, an amateur football club, which plays in the Martyr's Memorial B-Division League, is based in Tokha.

References

External links 
 Tokha

Populated places in Kathmandu District